Ganteaume is a surname. Notable people with the surname include:

Andy Ganteaume (1921–2016), Trinidadian cricketer 
Honoré Joseph Antoine Ganteaume (1755–1818), French Navy officer
Ganteaume's expeditions of 1801, three connected major French Navy operations of the spring of 1801 during the French Revolutionary Wars